ADST may refer to:
 Association for Diplomatic Studies and Training, an American nonprofit organization
 Australian Daylight Saving Time
 Asymmetric discrete sine transform